The New England Small Collegiate Athletic Conference (NESCAC) is an American collegiate athletic conference comprising sports teams from eleven highly selective liberal arts institutions of higher education in the Northeastern United States. The eleven institutions are Amherst College, Bates College, Bowdoin College, Colby College, Connecticut College, Hamilton College, Middlebury College, Tufts University, Trinity College, Wesleyan University, and Williams College.

The conference originated with an agreement among Amherst, Bowdoin, Wesleyan and Williams in 1955. In 1971, Bates, Colby, Hamilton, Middlebury, Trinity, Tufts, and Union College joined on and the NESCAC was officially formed. Union withdrew in 1977 and was replaced by Connecticut College in 1982. The members are grouped within the NCAA Division III athletic conference. Members of the conference have some of the largest financial endowments of any liberal arts colleges in the world, with Williams College's $3.89 billion being the largest. Undergraduate enrollment at the schools ranges from about 1,800 to 6,000 (Tufts).

History 
Williams began its inaugural football season in 1881 and its rivalry with Amherst College is one of the longest at any level of college football. Tufts and Harvard played the first football game between two American colleges on June 4, 1875 which Tufts won 1-0.  Bates and Bowdoin have competed against each other athletically since the 1870s and subsequently share one of the ten oldest NCAA Division III football rivalries, in the United States, there is a long history of athletic competition between the two colleges and Colby. Colby began its now most notable hockey rivalry, with Bowdoin in 1922.

In 1899, Amherst, Wesleyan and Williams schools first began to compete together as the "Triangular League". Since then they have continued to play each other in most sports on a regular basis. The conference originated with an agreement among Amherst, Bowdoin, Wesleyan and Williams in 1955. Later, Bates, Colby, Connecticut College, Hamilton, Middlebury, Trinity, Tufts joined and the NESCAC was officially formed. The Conference was created out of a concern for the direction of intercollegiate athletic programs and remains committed to keeping a proper perspective on the role of sport in higher education.

Member institutions believe athletic teams should be representative of school's entire student bodies and hew to NCAA Division III admissions and financial policies prohibiting athletic scholarships while awarding financial aid solely on the basis of need. Due to the prestigious reputations of its member schools, the NESCAC is able to attract many of the most athletically and intellectually gifted student-athletes in the country. Members stress that intercollegiate athletic programs should operate in harmony with the educational mission of each institution. Schools are committed to maintaining common boundaries to keep athletics strong yet in proportion to their overall academic mission. Presidents of each NESCAC institution control intercollegiate athletic policy. Conference tenets are usually more restrictive than those of the NCAA Division III regarding season length, number of contests and post-season competition.

Four NESCAC institutions are among the 39 that founded the NCAA in 1905: Amherst, Tufts, Wesleyan, and Williams. Prior to 1993 NESCAC generally did not allow member schools to send teams to NCAA championships. Since then all sports except football have had this freedom, many excelling in the NCAA Division III championships. The NACDA Directors' Cup, awarded since 1996 to the college or university in each NCAA Division that wins the most college championships, has been claimed at the Division III level by a NESCAC institution every year except 1998. In the 2012–13 season, four of the top ten NACDA Director's Cup institutions were from NESCAC: Williams (1), Middlebury (3), Amherst (6), and Tufts (8).

Chronological timeline 
 1971 - The New England Small College Athletic Conference (NESCAC) was founded. Charter members included Amherst College, Bates College, Bowdoin College, Colby College, Hamilton College, Middlebury College, Trinity College, Tufts University, Union College, Wesleyan University and Williams College, effective beginning the 1971-72 academic year.
 1977 - Union (N.Y.) left the NESCAC, effective after 1976-77 academic year.
 1982 - Connecticut College joined the NESCAC, effective in the 1982-83 academic year.

Member schools 

Member colleges of the athletic conference possesses some of the largest financial endowments in the world. As of the 2021-2022 academic year, Williams College in Williamstown, Massachusetts, has the largest endowment of any college in the conference, followed closely by Amherst, and then Bowdoin and Tufts respectively. Admission to NESCAC institutions is often highly competitive, with most member schools touting acceptance rates lower than 15 percent as of the 2020-2021 admissions cycle. Many NESCAC schools are also some of the oldest institutions of higher education in the United States, with Williams, Bowdoin and Middlebury being among the 40 oldest institutions in the country.

Current members 
The NESCAC currently has 11 full members, all are private schools:

Notes

Former member

Membership timeline

Academics 

Many schools in the New England Small College Athletic Conference are known for low grade inflation, grade deflation, and rigorous academic standards. Some members have received limited media coverage over perceived grade inflation and deflation.

The colleges are also known for a range of high and relatively low tuition rates and comprehensive fees. Some of the colleges have been named the most expensive in the United States.

Association of American Universities
Tufts University is a member of the prestigious Association of American Universities.

Geographic distribution 
Most applicants to schools in the NESCAC come from the Northeast, largely from the New York City, Boston, and Philadelphia areas. As all NESCAC schools are located on the East Coast, and all but one are in New England, most graduates end up working and residing in the Northeast after graduation.

Spending and revenue
Total revenue includes ticket sales, contributions and donations, rights/licensing, student fees, school funds, and all other sources including TV income, camp income, food, and novelties. Total expenses includes coaching/staff, buildings/grounds, maintenance, utilities and rental fees, and all other costs including recruiting, team travel, equipment and uniforms, conference dues, and insurance costs.

Facilities

Culture 
Many colleges banned fraternities and sororities on the grounds of unwarranted exclusivity, and provided on-campus social houses for all students to engage with. Williams College displaced their fraternity system in the 1960s due to high levels of racial and religious discrimination. Williams College President Chandler stated, "there remained the system of blackballing and secret agreements between some fraternities and their national bodies to exclude blacks and Jews... it was essentially a caste system based on socioeconomic status as perceived by students."

Bates rejected the fraternity system in 1855, when it was founded. Colby disbanded its fraternities and sororities in 1984. At Bowdoin, fraternities were phased out in 2000. Despite the lack of Greek life, NESCAC schools are widely known for a prominent drinking culture.

Schools within the NESCAC conference have made institutional efforts to diversify student body, and attract and wide range of students to their institutions. Many schools in the NESCAC provide significant financial aid to help increase the enrollment of lower income and middle class students.

Notable alumni 

Schools in the New England Small College Athletic Conference have graduated three U.S. presidents. The first president to graduate from the athletic conference was Franklin Pierce, the 14th president of the United States, a Bowdoin graduate of 1824. The 20th president, James A. Garfield, graduated from Williams College in 1856. The third U.S. president to graduate from a NESCAC institution was Calvin Coolidge, who graduated from Amherst College in 1895. President Chester Arthur was an 1848 graduate of Union College, a former NESCAC member, and President Woodrow Wilson was a professor at Wesleyan from 1888 to 1890.

Sports 
The New England Small College Athletic Conference sponsors championship competition in 13 men's and 14 women's NCAA sanctioned sports.

Men's sponsored sports by school

Men's varsity sports not sponsored by the New England Small College Athletic Conference that are played by NESCAC schools

Notes

Women's sponsored sports by school

Women's varsity sports not sponsored by the New England Small College Athletic Conference that are played by NESCAC schools

Notes

Football 
Until the 2017 season, the 10 football-playing NESCAC schools only played 8 regular season games. On April 27, 2017, the NESCAC announced that it would adopt a full 9-game round robin schedule.

In addition to the ban on postseason play, the NESCAC football league is notable for member teams playing conference games only. While some Division II and Division III teams play only conference schedules, NESCAC is unique in all of its members playing only within conference games.

Baseball
NESCAC Baseball is the only men's sport to utilize divisions. Bates, Bowdoin, Colby, Tufts, and Trinity compete in the East Division, while Amherst, Hamilton, Middlebury, Wesleyan, and Williams compete in the West Division. Connecticut College does not sponsor baseball.

The NESCAC has won the College World Series once: by the Trinity Bantams in 2008. Current member schools have appeared in the College World Series a combined total of 5 times.

Notes

NCAA team championships

The Middlebury Panthers lead the NESCAC in NCAA men's titles with 15, while the Williams Ephs lead in women's titles with 30 and in overall NCAA titles with 38. Excluded from this list are all national championships earned outside the scope of NCAA competition, including women's AIAW championships.

The following is a list of NCAA-recognized national team championships by NESCAC schools.

Baseball (1):
 2008 – Trinity

Men's basketball (3):
 2003 – Williams
 2007 – Amherst
 2013 – Amherst

Women's basketball (3):
 2011 – Amherst
 2017 – Amherst
 2018 – Amherst

Men's cross country (2):
 1994 – Williams
 1995 – Williams

Women's cross country (10):
 2000 – Middlebury
 2001 – Middlebury
 2002 – Williams
 2003 – Middlebury
 2004 – Williams
 2006 – Middlebury
 2007 – Amherst
 2008 – Middlebury
 2010 – Middlebury
 2015 – Williams

Field hockey (10):
 1998 – Middlebury
 2007 – Bowdoin
 2008 – Bowdoin
 2010 – Bowdoin
 2012 – Tufts
 2013 – Bowdoin
 2015 – Middlebury
 2017 – Middlebury
 2018 – Middlebury
 2019 – Middlebury

Women's golf (1):
 2015 – Williams

Men's ice hockey (9):
 1995 – Middlebury
 1996 – Middlebury
 1997 – Middlebury
 1998 – Middlebury
 1999 – Middlebury
 2004 – Middlebury
 2005 – Middlebury
 2006 – Middlebury
 2015 – Trinity

Women's ice hockey (5):
 2004 – Middlebury
 2005 – Middlebury
 2006 – Middlebury
 2009 – Amherst
 2010 – Amherst

Men's lacrosse (7):
 2000 – Middlebury
 2001 – Middlebury
 2002 – Middlebury
 2010 – Tufts
 2014 – Tufts
 2015 – Tufts
 2018 – Wesleyan

Women's lacrosse (10):
 1997 – Middlebury
 1999 – Middlebury
 2001 – Middlebury
 2002 – Middlebury
 2003 – Amherst
 2004 – Middlebury
 2008 – Hamilton
 2012 – Trinity
 2016 – Middlebury
 2019 – Middlebury

Women's rowing (15)
 2002 – Williams
 2003 – Colby
 2006 – Williams
 2007 – Williams
 2008 – Williams
 2009 – Williams
 2010 – Williams
 2011 – Williams
 2012 – Williams
 2013 – Williams
 2014 - Trinity
 2015 – Bates
 2017 – Bates
 2018 – Bates
 2019 – Bates
 2021 – Bates

Men's soccer (7):
 1995 – Williams
 2007 – Middlebury
 2014 – Tufts
 2015 – Amherst
 2016 – Tufts
 2018 – Tufts
 2019 – Tufts
 2021 – Connecticut College

Women's soccer (3):
 2015 – Williams
 2017 – Williams
 2018 – Williams

Softball (3):
 2013 – Tufts
 2014 – Tufts
 2015 – Tufts

Women's swimming & diving (2):
 1982 – Williams
 1983 – WilliamsMen's tennis (10): 1999 – Williams
 2001 – Williams
 2002 – Williams
 2004 – Middlebury
 2010 – Middlebury
 2011 – Amherst
 2013 – Williams
 2014 – Amherst
 2016 – Bowdoin
 2018 – MiddleburyWomen's tennis (12): 1999 – Amherst
 2001 – Williams
 2002 – Williams
 2008 – Williams
 2009 – Williams
 2010 – Williams
 2011 – Williams
 2012 – Williams
 2013 – Williams
 2015 – Williams
 2017 – Williams
 2019 – WesleyanWomen's indoor track (2):'''
 2007 – Williams
 2019 – Williams

See also 
 The Little Ivies: a grouping of small liberal arts colleges, also in the Northeastern United States, comparable to Ivy League universities
 The Colby-Bates-Bowdoin Consortium: three small liberal arts colleges known as the "Maine Big Three"
 The Little Three: three small liberal arts colleges in Massachusetts and Connecticut comparable to the "Big Three"

References

External links 
 

 
Hadley, Massachusetts
Organizations based in Massachusetts
Sports leagues established in 1971
Sports in New England
College sports in Massachusetts
College sports in Connecticut
College sports in Maine
College sports in Vermont
College sports in New York (state)